The 2012 All-Ireland Minor Football Championship was the premier "knockout" competition for under-18 competitors who play the game of Gaelic football in Ireland. The games were organised by the Gaelic Athletic Association. The 2012 series of games started in April with the majority of the games played during the summer months. The All-Ireland Minor Football Final took place on 23 September in Croke Park, Dublin, preceding the Senior Game, and was won by Dublin.

Results

Leinster Minor Football Championship

Rob Robin

Preliminary round

Quarter-finals

Semi-finals

Final

Munster Minor Football Championship

Rob Robin

Quarter-finals

Semi-finals

Final

Ulster Minor Football Championship

Preliminary round

Quarter-finals

Semi-finals

Final

Connacht Minor Football Championship

Quarter-final

Semi-finals

Final

All Ireland Series

Quarter-finals

Semi-finals

Final

All-Ireland Minor Football Championship
All-Ireland Minor Football Championship